Swami Vivekanand Road, shortened to S.V. Road, is a major arterial road in the western suburbs of the city of Mumbai, India. Swami Vivekanand Road was earlier known as Ghodbunder Road because of being only road parallel to the coast. One can easily find the name , Ghodbunder Road still being used in the electoral roll.

References 

Roads in Mumbai